Pevensey is a town in Dr Nkosazana Dlamini-Zuma Local Municipality in the KwaZulu-Natal province of South Africa.

References

Populated places in the Dr Nkosazana Dlamini-Zuma Local Municipality